Frederika "Freddie" Jacoba van der Goes (26 November 1908 – 24 October 1976) was a South African freestyle swimmer who competed in the 1928 Summer Olympics.

She was born and died in Pretoria.

In 1928 she was a member of the South African relay team which won the bronze medal in the 4×100 m freestyle relay event

She also competed in the 400 metre freestyle competition and finished fifth.

External links

1908 births
1976 deaths
Afrikaner people
South African people of Dutch descent
South African female swimmers
South African female freestyle swimmers
Olympic swimmers of South Africa
Swimmers at the 1928 Summer Olympics
Olympic bronze medalists for South Africa
Sportspeople from Pretoria
Transvaal Colony people
Olympic bronze medalists in swimming
Medalists at the 1928 Summer Olympics
20th-century South African women